Jaén is the urban capital city of the province of Jaén, in the autonomous community of Andalusia, Spain.

The city of Jaén is the administrative and industrial centre for the province. Industrial establishments in the city include chemical works, tanneries, distilleries, cookie factories, textile factories, as well as agricultural and olive oil processing machinery industry.

The layout of Jaén is determined by its position in the hills of the Santa Catalina mountains, with steep, narrow streets, in the historical central city district.

Its population is 112,757 (2020), about one-sixth of the population of the province. Recently Jaén has had a great increase in cultural tourism, having received 604,523 tourists along the year 2015, 10% more than in 2014. 
The city is also known as the World Capital of Olive Oil, because it is the biggest producer of the oil, known by locals as liquid gold.

Etymology 
The name is most likely derived from the Roman name Villa Gaiena (Villa of Gaius). It was called Jayyān during the time of Al-Andalus.

The inhabitants of the city are known as Jienenses.

History

The area was populated since ancient times, with remains of city walls in the  site in the north of the city reportedly dating back in time to the Chalcolithic, roughly four millennia ago.

The city was seized by Scipio Africanus away from Carthage by 207 BC, in the context of the Second Punic War. Given the former alliance of the city with the Punics, following the Roman conquest the city probably endured a harsh time as civitas stipendaria. During the Roman Empire, in the time of the Flavian dynasty, Aurgi became a municipium, .

Following the Umayyad conquest of the Iberian Peninsula, the name of Ŷaīyyān (of unclear origin) was mentioned in Hispano-Arab sources already in the 8th century. Close to Córdoba, the city became the head of an important  in the emiral/caliphal period of Al-Andalus, extending across a territory with some similarities to the current province. During the turbulent 11th century, in the context of the Fitna of al-Andalus, the wider kūra was territory in dispute between the most powerful neighbouring taifas, such as Córdoba, Granada or Toledo, splitting up its territory. Jaén was conquered by Habbus al-Muzaffar, leader of the Zirid Taifa of Granada. Decades after the final demise of the caliphate of Córdoba, Jaén was conquered by the Almoravids in 1091.

Taken in 1159 by Ibn Mardanīš (the Rey Lobo, ruler of Valencia opposed to the spread of the Almohad Empire), his collaborator (and father-in-law) Ibn Hamušk surrendered and yielded Jaén to the almohads in 1169.

The city was besieged again in 1230 by Ferdinand, who lifted the siege after the news of the death of his father, Alfonso IX of León. Depleted from its defences and surrounding fields, the city was surrendered by Muhammad I of Granada to Ferdinand III on 28 February 1246. Also in 1246, the city was granted a fuero (charter) similar to that of Toledo, becoming in turn the model for the fueros granted to Jódar (1272), Arjona (1284), Alcalá la Real (1341) and Priego (1341). Following the conquest, by 1248–49, the Diocese of Baeza was moved to Jaén.

Despite nominally featuring as the head of the Kingdom of Jaén since the conquest, the importance of Jaén within the demarcation was balanced by those of the cities of Baeza and Úbeda. It only began to stand out in relation to its growing strategic importance closer to the border with the Kingdom of Granada, consolidating its military and administrative functions. Unlike those cities, that developed an important textile craftmanship activity, Jaén's economic activity remained nonetheless largely agricultural well entered the Early Modern period.

Intitulation
The intitulation of the city is: (Spanish) "La Muy Noble y muy Leal Ciudad de Jaén, Guarda y Defendimiento de los Reynos de Castilla", (English) "The Very Noble and very Loyal City of Jaén, Guard and Defense of the Kingdoms of Castile," a title that was given to the city by King Enrique II of Castile to the city of Jaén, due to the privileges that the city had, and to the role that the city was playing in the defense of the Kingdom of Castile against the arabs.

Geography

Location 
The city lies at the feet of the Sierra de , one of the subranges of the Subbaetic System, the inner system of the Baetic Mountains which leaves the Guadalquivir Valley to the North. The surroundings of the city are rich in small Mesozoic karstic aquifers. The  flows close to the city.

Climate 
Jaén has a hot-summer Mediterranean climate, closely bordering on a semi-arid climate with dry, hot summers and mild, moderately wet winters. Despite its very inland location at an altitude around  Jaén barely gets 1 snowy day and just 3 days with lows under  on average during winters. Jaén gets around 2800-3000 sunshine hours on average.

Culture

Landmarks

Saint Catherine's Castle (Castillo de Santa Catalina) sits on the top of a hill overlooking the city. Previously there had existed a fortress of Arabic origin (Abrehui's castle), of which some remains still exist. The current construction is of Christian origin, raised after the conquest of the city by Ferdinand III of Castile, called the Saint, in 1246.

Jaén Cathedral is one of the most important Renaissance-style cathedrals. Construction began in 1570 and was completed in 1802. It is dedicated to the Assumption of the Virgin, and it was built to shelter the relic of the Holy Face, or Veil of Veronica, lodged at the major chapel and exposed to the public every Friday. Due to the length of time in its construction,  different artistic styles can be appreciated, the most prominent being Renaissance; Andrés de Vandelvira the most important architect. He is the greatest exponent of the Andalusian Renaissance. It aspires to be listed as a World Heritage Site by UNESCO.

The Arab Baths (Baños Arabes) in Jaén are among the largest Islamic bathhouses preserved in Spain. They can be visited under Villardompardo's Palace (another important landmark in the city). These Arab baths had the function in their origins of purifying all the visitors who entered the city of Jaén. However, nowadays they are not in use, being a great tourist and historical attraction.

Other important landmarks are the Museum of Arts and Popular Customs, the International Museum of Naïf Art, San Andrés's Chapel, the Provincial Museum of Jaén (which shelters an important collection of archaeological Iberian remains), Saint Ildefonso's church, La Magdalena church, etc.

University
The University of Jaén currently consists of approximately 18,000 students and 27 degree courses. This university is present in the city, in the Campus "Las Lagunillas", and also in Úbeda and Linares with some of the degree courses. It is a modern university, founded in 1993, and has large foreign student population. The University has signed international exchanges with The United States of America, Asia, several American countries and a great Erasmus experience within more than 15 European countries.

Language
The language spoken in Jaén is the official language of Spain, Spanish. The variety of Spanish spoken in this province displays some of the characteristics of Andalusian speech, such as dropping of final -s in plural formation: gafa for gafas (and consequent final vowel opening) in the word "glasses", or dropping of /d/ in intervocalic position in regular participles of verbs: e.g. acabao for acabado. Some of these variants can be consulted in the Diccionario de Vocabulario Andaluz compiled by the local lexicographer Alcalá Venceslada, which was reprinted by the University of Jaén some years ago. This dictionary also compiles some other variants of Andalusian present in other parts of the autonomous community.

There are different expressions typical of the area, namely the interjection "¡ea!" (also present in other dialectal variants) which has no particular exact meaning or "¡lavística!" /la'vistika/, which is believed to be a contraction of the expression "la Vírgen de Tíscar", a popular virgin of the province, although there are no exact data to confirm the origin of the last expression which is, nevertheless, widespread among speakers of the province.

Transport

Public transport

Bus 
Jaén has 26 service lines that connect the various neighbourhoods of the capital, being able to use the metro card consortium. Buses are characterised by their yellow colour. Jaén has frequent connections to Granada, Málaga, Córdoba and other Spanish cities from its central bus station, placed in the city centre. Jaén Bus Station has been declared "Bien de Interes Cultural" due to its modern representative arquitecture.

Jaén Tram 
The tram system in Jaén opened in 2011 and within two weeks was stopped. The tranvía has yet to resume services, although there was talk of reinstalling the service in 2021, it is not yet underway.

Train 
Jaén is served by the Jaén railway station, terminal of the Madrid–Jaén high speed railway line. Jaén is also connected to Córdoba and Sevilla by train.

Airport 
Jaén does not have an airport. The closest airports to the city are Granada Airport (65 km) and Málaga Airport (136 km).

Leisure and entertainment

Festivals

Feria de San Lucas: On 18 October Jaén celebrates his biggest festivity. It lasts more than a week where jienenses and visitors can enjoy music, Sevillanas dancing, gastronomy, culture and tradition.

Romeria de Santa Catalina: Procession in the hill with the same name where the Castle is located to honour the Saint Patron of the City. It is typical to eat sardines and barbecue in the forest around the Castle.

San Anton: The 16 January it is celebrated the fires of San Anton. In the different neighbourhoods there are built bonfires and people eat and sing around them celebrating the beginning of the year. Also  the International Urban Race of San Anton takes place that night, the fifth in the Spanish Ranking of Athletism.

Virgen de la Capilla: The 11 June Jaén celebrates the appearance of the Virgin Mary in the city. A weekend where there are flower offerings and a Virgin procession, as well as traditional activities to show the culture of the city.

Holy Week: The tradition of celebrating the Holy Week in the city started in the Middle Ages, and nowadays it has been declared "Bien de Interés Turístico-Cultural Andaluz" since 2006 and "Fiesta de Interés Turístico Nacional de Andalucía". From Palm Sunday until Resurrection Sunday 17 catholic brotherhoods carry out their processions through the streets of Jaén.

Gastronomy

The gastronomy of Jaén is very varied, emphasizing local dishes such as the pipirrana (tomato, green peppers, breadcrumbs, garlic shoots, olive oil, vinegar, salt and hard-boiled egg); "spinach a la Jaén" (garlic, croûtons, spiced sausage, bayleaf, egg, orange zest and vinegar); "rice a la Jaén" (very weak), "veal with chopped garlic", "trout from the rivers of Jaén" (trout, butter, chunks of ham with bacon, parsley, white wine and salt), "ajo blanco a la Jaén" (raw almond, olive oil, eggs, garlic, salt, vinegar and water).

Among the most well-known confectioneries of Jaén is "rice pudding", "gachas of Jaén" (a sort of porridge), "pestiños", "gusanillos" and "ochíos".

In Jaén the eating of tapas is very common; numerous bars exist where, when purchasing a beer, the customer is also given a free snack to accompany the drink. The tapas vary from place to place and in some bars it is even possible to choose from a tapas menu, though this is not normally the case.

Sports

The city's football team is Real Jaén, who play in the Nuevo Estadio de La Victoria.

The city has two major sporting facilities: the Fuentezuelas and the Salobreja, together with the university sports facilities. Trekking and climbing associations also exist, such as El Lagarto and Jabalcuz.

The Vía Verde del Aceite a former railway that ran from Jaén to Puente Genil in the province of Córdoba, is now used for recreational cycling walking and running.

There are various competitions which have a great international importance, for example, those related to chess and athletics.

Music
The most important event is the International Piano Competition Premio Jaén (in Spanish: Concurso Internacional de Piano Premio Jaén) that is the oldest and most important piano competition in Spain. It started in 1953 with Pablo Castillo García-Negrete, an architect who began to donate the first cash prizes of only some thousands of pesetas. Nowadays the prize consist of €57,000 and the recording of classical music albums in professional studios. The last winner of this significant competition was the Chinese pianist Yin Yu Qin, in 2008, in the fiftieth competition.

There are other events such as the Ciclos de Rock and the Lagarto Rock Festival.

References
Citations

Bibliography

External links

WikiSatellite view of Jaén at WikiMapia
Official Tourism portal of Jaén 
Guía documental del Bicentenario de la Batalla de Bailén
Portal of tourism, leisure and culture of the province of Jaén
 Jaén en Fotografías
 Jaén y su Música
 Biblioteca de la Policía Local de Jaén
 Peña del Deportivo de la Coruña de Jaén
 Gastromonía, sácale el mayor partido a la cocina giennense
 Tranvía de Jaén

 
Municipalities in the Province of Jaén (Spain)
Province of Jaén (Spain)